Hamish Dymock Barton (born 16 July 1976) is a New Zealand cricket who played first-class cricket for Auckland and Canterbury. Barton played as a left-handed batsman and right-arm off break bowler.

Barton's father Peter and his uncle Hugh also played first class cricket in New Zealand.

References

External links
 

1976 births
Auckland cricketers
Canterbury cricketers
Argentine cricketers
Argentine people of New Zealand descent
Cricketers from Gisborne, New Zealand
Living people
Marylebone Cricket Club cricketers
New Zealand cricketers